This is a list of the prime ministers of Tanzania, from the establishment of the office of Chief Minister of Tanganyika in 1960 to the present day.

Tanzania was formed after the Zanzibar Revolution in 1964, when the People's Republic of Zanzibar united with mainland Tanganyika to form the United Republic of Tanganyika and Zanzibar, which was later renamed to the United Republic of Tanzania.

Chief Minister of Tanganyika

Prime ministers of Tanganyika

Prime ministers of Tanzania

See also
Tanzania
Politics of Tanzania
List of governors of Tanganyika
President of Tanzania
List of heads of state of Tanzania
Prime Minister of Tanzania
List of sultans of Zanzibar
President of Zanzibar
Vice President of Zanzibar
List of heads of government of Zanzibar
Lists of office-holders

Notes

External links
 World Statesmen – Tanzania
 Rulers.org – Tanzania

Tanzania, List of Prime Ministers of
 
Prime Ministers
Prime ministers